The 68th Corps was a corps formation of the German Army in World War I.  It was formed in March 1918 and was still in existence at the end of the war.

Chronicle 
The 68th Corps (z.b.V.) was established in March 1918.  Previously, it had been known as Nordkorps.

With the onset of trench warfare, the German Army recognised that it was no longer possible to maintain the traditional Corps unit, that is, one made up of two divisions.  Whereas at some times (and in some places) a Corps of two divisions was sufficient, at other times 5 or 6 divisions were necessary.  Therefore, under the Hindenburg regime (from summer 1916), new Corps headquarters were created without organic divisions.  These new Corps were designated
General Commands for Special Use.

68th Corps was still in existence at the end of the war.

Commanders 
The 68th Corps was commanded throughout its existence by Generalleutnant Adolf von Seckendorff.

See also 

German Army (German Empire)

References

Bibliography 
 

Corps of Germany in World War I
Military units and formations established in 1918
Military units and formations disestablished in 1919